Calamoschoena is a genus of moths of the family Crambidae.

Species
Calamoschoena ascriptalis Hampson in Poulton, 1916
Calamoschoena nigripunctalis Hampson, 1919
Calamoschoena sexpunctata (Aurivillius, 1925) 
Calamoschoena stictalis Hampson, 1919

References

Schoenobiinae
Crambidae genera